State Route 95 (SR 95) is a state route in the U.S. state of Tennessee.  It serves to connect Lenoir City with Greenback and Oak Ridge, via U.S. Route 321.

Route description
SR 95 serves as a secondary route between its southern terminus in Greenback and I-40 and as a primary highway for the rest of its duration.

SR 95 begins at US 411 (SR 33), in Greenback, and goes northwest predominantly along Lenoir City Road.  Curving through the Red Knobs, it passes through the communities of Centersville and Glendale, before reaching US 321 (SR 73).  This section of SR 95 is two-lane throughout, with no shoulders and minimum allowable lane widths.  The next , SR 95 is a hidden overlap of US 321, as it traverses through Lenoir City, intersecting US 11 (SR 2), I-75, and then US 70 (SR 1) in that city.

At the I-40 interchange, US 321 (SR 73) ends and SR 95 reemerges to continue the route towards  Oak Ridge.  Crossing the Clinch River, via the Charles Vanden Bulck Bridge, SR 95 enters Roane County and land controlled by the Department of Energy/Oak Ridge National Laboratory.  The highway curves along the various ridges, most access roads are controlled or blocked off.  As SR 95 approaches SR 58, the highway widens to four-lane before the interchange.  After the interchange, it continues north along Oak Ridge Turnpike as a four-lane divided highway.  It exits the Department of Energy's boundary near the Roane/Anderson county line, soon after neighborhoods begins to appear just off the road and bike lanes are along the shoulders.

In Anderson County, SR 95 serves as the main highway through Oak Ridge, with commercial businesses along its shoulders and neighborhoods connected by access roads.  At the center of Oak Ridge, SR 95 connects with SR 62 (Illinois Avenue), which continues to Oliver Springs and Knoxville.  Northeast of Oak Ridge, towards Clinton, SR 95 ends at the intersection of SR 61 (Oliver Springs Highway).

History

Junction list

References

External links
 

095
Transportation in Loudon County, Tennessee
Transportation in Roane County, Tennessee
Transportation in Anderson County, Tennessee
Oak Ridge, Tennessee